Park Tae-Woong  (born 30 January 1988) is a South Korean footballer who plays for Gyeongnam FC.

Club career statistics

External links 

1988 births
Living people
South Korean footballers
Gyeongnam FC players
Gangwon FC players
Suwon Samsung Bluewings players
Gimcheon Sangmu FC players
K League 2 players
K League 1 players
Association football midfielders
People from Gunsan
Sportspeople from North Jeolla Province